Samuel Augustus Gordon Barnes (August 10, 1875 – April 14, 1941) was a Canadian teacher, insurance salesman and politician from Alberta. He held public office on both the municipal and provincial levels of government in the province. He served for decades as an Edmonton Public School trustee, his first stint was from 1910 to 1917 and then from 1919 to 1925 and a third stint from 1926 to 1936. He also served a member of the Legislative Assembly of Alberta from 1935 to 1940 sitting with the Social Credit caucus in government and later as an Independent in opposition.

Early life
Samuel Augustus Gordon Barnes was born in 1875 in Warwick, Ontario. He grew up in the community taking his early schooling there. He moved to Toronto for his post secondary education taking it at Strathroy Collegiate Institute, Toronto Normal School and Toronto School of Pedagogy.

Barnes moved west after completing his education. He settled in the Northwest Territories at Melfort in 1897 and began a career as a school teacher. He lived in the town for five years before moving east to attend the University of Manitoba for a degree in mathematics. He moved back west settling in Edmonton in 1905. Shortly after arriving he founded an insurance business, that he ran until his death in 1941.

Political career

Edmonton politics
Barnes began his political career running for a seat as a trustee on the Edmonton Public School Board in the 1910 municipal election. He finished in third place of six candidates earning the final seat and his first two year term in office.

Due to a merger between the city of Strathcona and the city of Edmonton an early municipal election needed to be held. Barnes stood for his second term in the February 1912 municipal election. All candidates running for school board were elected, with Barnes finishing in third place to take another 2 year term.

With the reset of election cycles after the city merger Barnes two year term was cut short. He stood for his third term in the 1913 municipal election. He slipped to fourth place in the standings but was still re-elected for another two years.

Barnes stood for his fourth consecutive term in the 1915 municipal election. He was easily re-elected winning the second place seat, and coming just shy of heading the polls.

After spending four terms on the School Board, Barnes had mayoral ambitions. He ran for mayor in the 1917 municipal election. His popularity did not translate to the mayoral seat. He finished third in a five candidate field that was won by Harry Evans.

With the advent of partisan politics at the municipal level in Edmonton, Barnes associated himself with the Edmonton Labor Party. He ran for another term as Public School trustee under that banner in the 1919 municipal election. Barnes easily won the second place seat finishing just 13 votes from first place.

Barnes became President of the Edmonton Labor Party in 1921. He stood for re-election in the general election held that year and won easily heading the polls over the field of eight candidates.

Barnes stood for a seventh term in the 1923 municipal election. For the second time he once again finished first heading the polls by a significant margin over the six other candidates. At the end of his seventh term in 1925 he did not seek re-election and missed out of council for a year.

Barnes began his third stint as a Public School Trustee by running in the 1926 municipal election. His popularity carried over despite missing a year and was re-elected finishing first for the third time in a row.

Barnes ran for a ninth term in the 1928 municipal election, He finished first for the fourth time in a row winning his largest popular vote to date.

Barnes ran for a tenth term in the 1930 municipal election, exactly 20 years after first being elected to the position. His popularity slipped, but he held on to win the third and final two year term spot to win re-election.

Barnes stood for his eleventh term in office in the 1932 municipal election. He managed to keep his third place seat with a sizable plurality over third place in the field of seven candidates.

Barnes ran for his twelfth and final term as a trustee in the 1934 municipal election. He moved back into second place winning the highest popular vote of his career.

A year into his last term he ran for a seat to the Alberta Legislature and won. He held both seats until his trustee term expired in 1936.

While still holding his provincial seat, Barnes made a final bid for public office by running for mayor of Edmonton. He was defeated in a landslide by John Wesley Fry in a two way race taking only 19.12% of the popular vote.

Provincial politics
Barnes ran for a seat to the Alberta Legislature under the Social Credit banner in the 1935 Alberta general election. He won the second seat in the Edmonton electoral district finishing ahead of twenty-five other candidates.

Barnes was expelled from the Social Credit caucus after the 1937 Social Credit backbenchers' revolt. He sat the rest of his term on the opposition benches as an Independent.

Barnes ran for a second term in the 1940 provincial election. He sought re-election as an Independent Progressive candidate. His career in the legislature was over as he was defeated finishing in eighteenth place out of the nineteen candidates.

Late life
Barnes in his later years became managing director of Savings Bonds of Canada. He had also joined the Native Sons of Canada club.

After the demise of his political career with his unsuccessful run for mayor and his defeat from the Legislature, Barnes continued on with his insurance practice. He died a year after being defeated from office at his desk in his office on April 14, 1941.

References

External links
Alberta Legislature Membership Listing

1875 births
1941 deaths
University of Manitoba alumni
Alberta Social Credit Party MLAs
Independent Alberta MLAs